"Stop By" is a single released in 1997 by American  Neo soul singer Rahsaan Patterson. The song is the lead single in support of his debut studio album, Rahsaan Patterson. "Stop By" failed to chart on Billboard's Hot R&B/Hip-Hop Songs, the song peaked at no.39 on Hot R&B Airplay. The song was also released as a single in the UK in 1998.

Track listing
UK CD" single

Charts

References

Rahsaan Patterson songs
Songs written by Keith Crouch
Songs written by Rahsaan Patterson
1997 songs
MCA Records singles
1997 debut singles